is a Japanese female pop group, consisting of 10 former members of the Japanese girl group Morning Musume. It was created in 2011. As with Morning Musume, the group is managed by the Up-Front Agency and produced by Tsunku.

During the announcement of the formation of Dream Morning Musume, Tsuji Nozomi was also planned to be included in the group. She turned down the offer citing that she wants to devote her time to taking care of her children.

The band debuted in April 2011 with the album Dreams 1, which ranked 10th in the Oricon Weekly Albums Chart.

On September 24, 2011, Dream Morning Musume started its first nationwide concert tour, although Miki Fujimoto was absent on maternity leave.

The group's first single "Shining Butterfly" was released on February 15, 2012, debuting at number 7 in the Oricon daily sales ranking for February 14.

Members

Discography

Singles

Albums

DVD

Videography

Music videos

References

External links 
  
 Profile at Oricon 

Japanese pop music groups
Japanese girl groups
Japanese idol groups
Hello! Project
Morning Musume
2011 establishments in Japan
Musical groups from Tokyo
Up-Front Group